The Maritime Silk Road or Maritime Silk Route is the maritime section of the historic Silk Road that connected Southeast Asia, China, the Indian subcontinent, the Arabian peninsula, Somalia, Egypt and Europe. It began by the 2nd century BCE and flourished later on until the 15th century CE. The Maritime Silk Road was primarily established and operated by Austronesian sailors in Southeast Asia, Tamil merchants in India and Southeast Asia, and by Persian and Arab traders in the Arabian Sea and beyond. The network followed the footsteps of an older maritime network, the Maritime Jade Road of Taiwan and maritime Southeast Asia, as well as the maritime spice networks of Southeast Asia, Sri Lanka, India, and the Indian Ocean, coinciding with these ancient maritime trade roads by the current era.

History

The Maritime Silk Road is a relatively new trading network compared to other historical networks of Asia, but its importance is increasing. The Maritime Jade Road, a jade trade network, in Southeast Asia which sprang in Taiwan and the Philippines was an independent trading network in operation thousands of years before the Maritime Silk Road. This independent network was in existence for 3,000 years from 2000 BCE to 1000 CE. The trade was established by links between the indigenous peoples of Taiwan and the Philippines, and later included parts of Vietnam, Malaysia, Indonesia, Thailand, and other areas in Southeast Asia. It was in existence prior to the Maritime Silk Road, and was led by the animist sea-faring societies of Southeast Asia. Lingling-o artifacts are one of the notable archeological finds originating from this animist-led trade network. During the operation of the Maritime Jade Road, Austronesian spice trade networks were also established by Islander Southeast Asians with Sri Lanka and Southern India by around 1000 to 600 BCE. These networks of jade and spice would later help establish the Maritime Silk Road, which slowly began by 200 BCE, but only flourished later on, coinciding with existing and older trade networks.

For most of its history, Austronesian thalassocracies controlled the flow of the Maritime Silk Road, especially the polities around the straits of Malacca and Bangka, the Malay peninsula, and the Mekong delta; although Chinese records misidentified these kingdoms as being "Indian" due to the Indianization of these regions. The route was influential in the early spread of Hinduism and Buddhism to the east. Before sailing on open seas was possible, much of the trade with China passed through the Tonkin Gulf. Several trading ports thrived in the area, and the region of Jiaozhi (Northern Vietnam), in particular, accumulated enormous wealth.

Tang records indicate that Srivijaya, founded at Palembang in 682 CE, rose to dominate the trade in the region around the straits and the South China Sea emporium by controlling the trade in luxury aromatics and Buddhist artifacts from West Asia to a thriving Tang market. Chinese records also indicate that the early Chinese Buddhist pilgrims to South Asia booked passage with the Austronesian ships that traded in Chinese ports. Books written by Chinese monks like Wan Chen and Hui-Lin contain detailed accounts of the large trading vessels from Southeast Asia dating back to at least the 3rd century CE.

Prior to the 10th century, the route was primarily used by Southeast Asian traders, although Tamil and Persian traders also sailed them. By the 7th century CE, Arab dhow traders ventured into the routes, leading to the earliest spread of Islam into Southeast Asian polities.

By the 10th to 13th centuries, the Song dynasty of China started building its own trading fleets, despite the traditional Chinese Confucian disdain for trade. This was partly due to the loss of access by the Song dynasty to the overland Silk Road. The Chinese fleets started sending trading expeditions to the region they referred to as Nan hai (mostly dominated by the Srivijaya), venturing as far south as the Sulu Sea and the Java Sea. This led to the establishment of Chinese trading colonies in Southeast Asia, a boom in the maritime trade, and the emergence of the ports of "Chinchew" (Quanzhou) and "Canton" (Guangzhou) as regional trade centers in China. By the 17th century, Selden Map elucidates the span of trade routes across the Far East, especially in Southeast Asia, with its epicenter emanating from a point near the cities of Quanzhou and Zhangzhou in Southern Fujian, from which a principal route goes northeast towards Nagasaki and southwest towards Hoi An, then Champa, and then on to Pahang, and then with another route heading past Penghu towards a point northwest by Manila.

After a brief cessation of Chinese trade in the 14th century due to internal famines and droughts in China, the Ming dynasty reestablished the trade routes with Southeast Asia from the 15th to 17th centuries. They launched the expeditions of Zheng He, with the goal of forcing the "barbarian kings" of Southeast Asia to resume sending "tribute" to the Ming court. This was typical of the Sinocentric views at the time of viewing "trade as tribute", although ultimately Zheng He's expeditions  were successful in their goal of establishing trade networks with Malacca, the regional successor of Srivijaya. 

By the 16th century, the Age of Exploration had begun. The Portuguese Empire's capture of Malacca led to the transfer of the trade centers to the sultanates of Aceh and Johor. The new demand for spices from Southeast Asia and textiles from India and China by the European market led to another economic boom in the Maritime Silk Road. The arrival of the Spanish Empire in the Philippines and establishment of the Manila-Acapulco Galleon Trade ensured Manila's trade connection with Quanzhou and Zhangzhou, where Manila supplied the Spanish silver minted and mined from the Spanish Americas, and in turn Quanzhou or Zhangzhou supplied the Chinaware and silk to Manila, and spice from the spice trade from the south of the Philippines, as the Spaniards competed with the Portuguese for control of the share of the spice trade in the Spice Islands of Moluccas, also went through Manila and its trade connection, where all were traded over the Pacific to Acapulco in Mexico and throughout the Spanish Americas; and also later traded via the Flota de Indias (Spanish treasure fleet) from Veracruz in Mexico to Seville in Spain and to throughout Europe. The West Indies Spanish treasure fleet was the first permanent transatlantic trade route in history. Similarly, the Manila-Acapulco Galleon Trade route was the first permanent trade route across the Pacific. The influx of silver from the European colonial powers however, may have eventually undermined China's copper coinage, leading to the collapse of the Ming dynasty, due to not enough currency circulating to the inland northern Chinese provinces, where the Qing dynasty expanded through the Ming dynasty's weakening hold. Eventually, the Spanish silver dollar acquired through Manila from over the Pacific from Mexico, circulated throughout the Far East, becoming the origins of many currencies in the region, such as the Chinese yuan, Japanese yen, Korean won, Philippine peso, Malaysian ringgit, French Indochinese piastre, etc. since it was widely traded across the Far East in the East Indies and East Asia.

The Qing dynasty initially continued the Ming philosophy of viewing trade as "tribute" to the court. However, increasing economic pressure finally forced the Kangxi Emperor to lift the ban on private trading in 1684, allowing foreigners to enter Chinese trading ports, and allowing Chinese traders to travel overseas. Alongside the official imperial trade, there was also notable trade by private groups, primarily by the Hokkien people.

Archaeology
The evidences of naval trade activities were shipwrecks recovered from the Java Sea — the Arabian dhow Belitung wreck dated to c. 826, the 10th century Intan wreck, and the Western-Austronesian vessel Cirebon wreck dated to the end of the 10th century.

Extent

The trade route encompassed numbers of seas and ocean; including South China Sea, Strait of Malacca, Indian Ocean, Gulf of Bengal, Arabian Sea, Persian Gulf and the Red Sea. The maritime route overlaps with historic Southeast Asian maritime trade, spice trade, Indian Ocean trade and after 8th century—the Arabian naval trade network. The network also extend eastward to the East China Sea and the Yellow Sea to connect China with the Korean Peninsula and the Japanese archipelago.

World Heritage nomination
In May 2017, experts from various fields have held a meeting in London to discuss the proposal to nominate "Maritime Silk Route" as a new UNESCO World Heritage Site. Issues have surfaced such as those concerning the Maritime Jade Road, which was falsely alluded as part of the so-called "Maritime Silk Road". The Maritime Jade Road is older than the Maritime Silk Road by more than two thousand years. Due to the importance of Maritime Silk Road, China (PRC) continues to promote construction on "One belt", which exactly refer to the Maritime Silk Route, for the One Belt One Road plan.

See also

References

2nd-century BC establishments
15th-century disestablishments
Silk Road
Ancient roads and tracks
Medieval Asia
Trade routes
Eurasian history
History of Southeast Asia
History of Imperial China
History of foreign trade in China
History of international relations
Ancient international relations
History of India
History of Indonesia
Foreign relations of ancient Rome
Economic history of China